Raine Tuononen (born July 7, 1970) is a Finnish former professional ice hockey defenceman.

Tuononen played four regular season games and three playoff games for his hometown team KalPa. After leaving KalPa in 1991, he spent the rest of his career in the Finnish lower leagues, including a return to KalPa for the 1999–00 season while they were playing in Suomi-sarja.

References

External links

1970 births
Living people
Finnish ice hockey defencemen
Hokki players
Iisalmen Peli-Karhut players
KalPa players
People from Kuopio
SaPKo players
Vaasan Sport players
Sportspeople from North Savo